Mukim Pengkalan Batu (also Mukim Pangkalan Batu) is a mukim in Brunei-Muara District, Brunei. The population was 14,492 in 2016.

Name 
The mukim is named after Kampong Pengkalan Batu, one of the villages it encompasses.

Geography 
The mukim is the southernmost mukim in the district, bordering Mukim Sengkurong to the north, Mukim Kilanas and Mukim Lumapas to the north-east, and Mukim Kiudang and Mukim Keriam in Tutong District to the south-west and north-west respectively. It also borders Limbang District in Sarawak, Malaysia to the east and south.

Demographics 
As of 2016 census, the population of Mukim Pengkalan Batu comprised 7,435 males and 7,057 females. The mukim had 2,288 households occupying 2,259 dwellings. The entire population lived in rural areas.

Villages 
Mukim Pengkalan Batu encompasses the following populated villages:

 Kampong Batang Perhentian
 Kampong Batong
 Kampong Batu Ampar
 Kampong Bebatik
 Kampong Bebuloh
 Kampong Imang
 Kampong Junjongan
 Kampong Kuala Lurah
 Kampong Limau Manis
 Kampong Masin 
 Kampong Panchor Murai
 Kampong Parit
 Kampong Pengkalan Batu
 Kampong Wasan

References 

Pengkalan Batu
Brunei-Muara District